Velimir Radman  (born 28 May 1983 in Banja Luka) is a Croatian football goalkeeper, who last played for NK Lošinj, a club based in Lošinj which competes in 4th Croatian league.

Club career
He played for NK Rijeka from 2002 to 2010, with a one-year loan spell to NK Opatija during the 2002–03 season. On 14 July 2010 he signed for Greek Superleague side Panserraikos.

On 6 June 2011 and after his good performances with the Serres team during the previous season, he signed a two-year contract for Atromitos.

International career
Radman has been capped twice for the Croatia national under-21 football team. He is also an ex-Croatia under-16 and under-19 international.

Honours
Rijeka
Croatian Cup: 2005, 2006

References

External links
 
Profile at Guardian.co.uk

1983 births
Living people
Sportspeople from Banja Luka
Bosnia and Herzegovina emigrants to Croatia
Association football goalkeepers
Croatian footballers
Croatia youth international footballers
Croatia under-21 international footballers
HNK Rijeka players
NK Opatija players
Panserraikos F.C. players
Atromitos F.C. players
Croatian Football League players
Super League Greece players
Croatian expatriate footballers
Expatriate footballers in Greece
Croatian expatriate sportspeople in Greece
HNK Rijeka non-playing staff